Jeanswest (formerly stylised JeansWest) is an  Australian apparel chain store. It operates in the market of casual wear and lifestyle, with denim playing an integral part in the product range. Its main rival is Just Jeans which has a similar range of clothing and denim.

Jeanswest has over 215 stores throughout Australia and New Zealand.

History

Domestic
The first Jeanswest store was opened by Alister Norwood in Perth, Western Australia in 1972. By 1984, there were 28 stores across Western Australia. In 1985, Jeanswest branched into Queensland, buying the Eagle Jeans chain of stores, followed by New South Wales in 1987 and Victoria in 1992. In 1990 Mr Norwood relinquished control of JeansWest to Peter Volk and Glorious Sun Group and the company's headquarters moved from Perth to Melbourne.

International
In 1993 the company expanded to China . Glorious Sun took over the company in 1994, when there were over 150 stores nationally across Australia.

The first store in New Zealand opened in 1996. The company has since expanded to the Middle East, Russia, Mauritius, and Peru represented under the name "Jeanswest Australia."

Administration
Jeanswest entered voluntary administration in Australia , leaving the future of its 146 Australian stores and the employment of its almost-1000 strong staff in doubt.

It was announced on 25 February 2020 that the chain would be bought by Hong Kong based Harbour Guidance Pty Ltd, in a deal that will save 106 of the affected Australian stores, meaning 40 stores will remain closed and their 308 staff members offered redundancies.

References

Further reading
http://www.theaustralian.com.au/business/companies/jeanswest-bottom-line-hit-by-slower-sales/news-story/21d18c8d2229ba7cc2b3821e00fe446f?nk=eef862bcb16f46e0befc1f710b90ff82-1480612273
http://www.ragtrader.com.au/news/jeanswest-exposes-its-factories
http://www.ragtrader.com.au/news/jeanswest-brings-back-australian-manufacturing
http://www.ragtrader.com.au/news/jeanswest-s-homegrown-trifecta

External links
 

Clothing retailers of Australia
Retail companies established in 1972
1972 establishments in Australia